Sweden competed at the 1948 Summer Olympics in London, England. 181 competitors, 162 men and 19 women, took part in 100 events in 18 sports.

Medalists

Athletics

Men's 110 metres hurdles
 Håkan Lidman
 Börje Rendin

Boxing

Canoeing

Cycling

Four cyclists, all men, represented Sweden in 1948.

Individual road race
 Nils Johansson
 Harry Snell
 Åke Olivestedt
 Olle Wänlund

Team road race
 Nils Johansson
 Harry Snell
 Åke Olivestedt
 Olle Wänlund

Diving

Equestrian

Fencing

Eight fencers, all men, represented Sweden in 1948.

Men's foil
 Bo Eriksson
 Nils Rydström

Men's épée
 Bengt Ljungquist
 Frank Cervell
 Carl Forssell

Men's team épée
 Sven Thofelt, Per Carleson, Frank Cervell, Carl Forssell, Bengt Ljungquist, Arne Tollbom

Men's sabre
 Bo Eriksson

Football

Summary

Gymnastics

Modern pentathlon

Three male pentathletes represented Sweden in 1948.

 Willie Grut
 Gösta Gärdin
 Sune Wehlin

Rowing

Sweden had three male rowers participate in two out of seven rowing events in 1948.

 Men's single sculls
 Curt Brunnqvist

 Men's coxless pair
 Evert Gunnarsson
 Bernt Torberntsson

Sailing

Thirteen Swedish sailor participated at the 1948 Summer Olympics.

Sweden had three reserves that did not participate in any events; Carl-Erik Ohlson, Charles Eriksson and Sven Rinman.

Shooting

Eleven shooters represented Sweden in 1948.

25 metre pistol
 Sven Lundquist
 Torsten Ullman
 Claes Egnell

50 metre pistol
 Torsten Ullman
 Sture Nordlund
 Lars Berg

300 metre rifle
 Kurt Johansson
 Holger Erbén
 Walther Fröstell

50 metre rifle
 Jonas Jonsson
 Uno Berg
 Erland Koch

Swimming

Water polo

Summary

Weightlifting

Wrestling

Art competitions

References

Nations at the 1948 Summer Olympics
1948
1948 in Swedish sport